Pan Am Flight Academy (formerly Pan Am International Flight Academy) is an aviation school that specializes in training airlines, pilots and aviation professionals from around the world. It is the only remaining division of Pan American World Airways, which declared bankruptcy in January 1991 and shut down in December of that year. Under the terms of the bankruptcy, the flight academy was allowed to remain open independently. It is presently owned by the holding company of All Nippon Airways.

In 2017 Pan Am International Flight Academy was awarded the Corporate Achievement Award by the Greater Miami Aviation Association recognizing the contributions of the corporation to the aviation industry. Pan Am International Flight Academy, Denver, was awarded the Export Achievement Certificate by the Denver office of the U.S. Commercial Services Division, a branch of the U.S. Department of Commerce.

History 
In 1980, Pan American World Airways' International Flight Academy opened for business in a new building located at the Miami International Airport (MIA). This training division operated until the airline closed on December 4, 1991. Under the terms of the airline bankruptcy, the training academy was permitted to remain open independently in 1992 under its current name, Pan Am International Flight Academy. The company began operations by using the flight simulator of the former airline at the same campus location.

In 2006, American Capital Strategies invested $58 million in Pan Am. Pan Am International Flight Academy, based out of Miami International Airport, has trained a substantial number of students from India.

In 2010, Pan Am International Flight Academy purchased Miami-based Aeroservice Aviation Center, LLC, located only a few blocks away. Under the terms of this agreement, Pan Am purchased all of Aeroservice's training and simulator assets, adding significantly to Pan Am's Miami training capabilities, classrooms, and campus size.

On July 30, 2013, ANA Holdings, the holding company of All Nippon Airways, announced they will acquire Pan Am Holdings, including Pan Am International Flight Academy.

Aviation school 

The flight academy, headquartered in Miami, trains pilots and aviation professionals from around the world. In 2017 Pan Am International Flight Academy trained over 5,000 individuals. Core training programs include pilot training, airline crew training, type rating training, ATP-CTP, aircraft maintenance training, flight attendant or cabin crew training, dispatchers, air traffic control, and career pilot academy or ab initio training at their location in Kissimmee.

The academy has training centers located throughout the United States and access to many centers around the world. The company, along with its licensed partners, has more than 200 aviation training programs and is certified to train pilots under major international authorities including: the Federal Aviation Administration, the European Aviation Safety Agency, the Civil Aviation Administration of China, the Civil Aviation Authority of the Philippines, the Civil Aviation Authority, the Directorate General of Civil Aviation and others.

It currently owns and operates more than 70 simulators and trains on the Boeing 707, Boeing 737, Boeing 747-200/400, Boeing 767, Boeing 777, Airbus A320 family, and Saab 340.

September 11 attacks 
On August 17, 2001, Zacarias Moussaoui, the so-called "20th hijacker" of the September 11, 2001, attacks, was arrested after an instructor at Pan Am International Flight Academy became suspicious of him. In a piece in The New York Times, Michael Erlandson, chief of staff on the Appropriations Subcommittee on Transportation is quoted as saying: "The Pan Am people are heroes who worked very diligently to make themselves heard at the FBI."

Television and film 

Because of their flight simulators and professional aviators, the Pan Am International Flight Academy is often approached to allow usage of their equipment and experts to TV shows and films.

In addition to its Miami headquarters, Pan Am has facilities in Las Vegas, Kissimmee, Tokyo and London and is currently providing training to clients in Asia and Europe through participating partners.

References

External links 
 

Pan Am
Aviation schools in Florida
Organizations based in Miami
Companies formerly listed on the Nasdaq
Educational institutions established in 1991
All Nippon Airways
1991 establishments in Florida
American subsidiaries of foreign companies
2013 mergers and acquisitions